Necmi Perekli (born 1948) is a former Turkish footballer. 

Necmi played for Trabzonspor in the late 1970s, becoming the first player of Trabzonspor who became the top scorer in Turkish 1st league (became Turkish Super League since 2002-03 season). He scored 18 goals in 22 appearances in the 1976-77 season, helping them to retain the title they had won for the first time the previous season. He was also played in Giresunspor (1972–1973), Beşiktaş JK (1973–1974) and Altay S.K. (1974–1975).

He currently works as a sports writer in Fotomaç, a sport newspaper in Turkey.

References

1947 births
Living people
Turkish footballers
Turkey international footballers
Turkey under-21 international footballers
Beşiktaş J.K. footballers
Altay S.K. footballers
Trabzonspor footballers
Giresunspor footballers

Association football forwards